Masa is type of dough made from corn.

Masa or MASA may also refer to:

 MASA (company), former bus manufacturer in Mexico
 Masa (land), a land to the west of Hatti in Late Bronze Age Anatolia
 Masa (musician), stage name of a Japanese musician
 Masa (restaurant), in New York City
 Masa Israel Journey, umbrella organization based in Israel
 Masa languages, a group of Chadic languages
 Masa people (also called Masana, Banana, or Yagoua), an ethnic group localized in Cameroon and Chad
 Masa, Estonia, village in Pihtla Parish, Saare County, Estonia
 Masa's Wine Bar & Kitchen, Michelin-rated restaurant in San Francisco, California
 Montenegrin Academy of Sciences and Arts
 Mines African Staff Association, a defunct Northern Rhodesian trade union
 Masa (mathematics), an abbreviation for maximal Abelian self-adjoint subalgebra
 Masa, a term for month in the Hindu calendar
 Mexicano Aeronáutica y Spacio Administración, fictional aerospace agency depicted in the South Park episode "Free Willzyx"
 Masa, Gurabo, Puerto Rico, a barrio in the municipality of Gurabo, Puerto Rico (U.S.)

See also
Massa (disambiguation)
 Matti (disambiguation), a Finnish male Christian name, a nickname of which is Masa